We'll Smile Again is a 1942 British musical comedy film directed by John Baxter and starring Bud Flanagan, Chesney Allen and Meinhart Maur.

Premise
A ring of Nazi spies infiltrate a film studio planning to use it for sending coded messages, but they are foiled by two of the low-level staff at the studio.

Cast

Production
It was known as Glamourflage and filming started 4 May 1942.

Critical reception
The Radio Times gave the film three out of five stars, and wrote "Unlike many stage, radio or television double acts who flounder when put on the big screen, Flanagan and Allen fared rather well as movie stars, and this is a typical effort, combining bright comedy with songs and human interest...Directed with no pretension by John Baxter, who made several of the duo's other popular films, it is an engaging showcase for one of Britain's best-loved song-and-comedy teams."

References

External links

1942 films
British musical comedy films
1942 musical comedy films
1940s English-language films
Films directed by John Baxter
British black-and-white films
1940s British films